Babysitting is a 2014 French comedy film shot in the "found footage" style. It is directed by Nicolas Benamou and Philippe Lacheau. The film is also the directorial debut of Philippe Lacheau which he co-wrote and also starred in along with Alice David and Vincent Desagnat.

Cast 

 Philippe Lacheau as Franck
 Alice David as Sonia
 Vincent Desagnat as Ernest
 Tarek Boudali as Sam
 Julien Arruti as Alex
 Grégoire Ludig as Paul
 David Marsais as Jean
 Gérard Jugnot as M. Schaudel
 Clotilde Courau as Mme Schaudel
 Philippe Duquesne as Agent Caillaud
 Charlotte Gabris as Estelle
 David Salles as Inspector Laville
 Philippe Brigaud as Monsieur Monet

Sequel 
In January 2015, Universal Pictures confirmed that a sequel was in production. It was released in December 2015 and titled Babysitting 2.

Remake
it was remade by  Iain Morris under production by eOne, Angry Films and Moonriver Content.

References

External links 
 

2014 films
2010s French-language films
French comedy films
2014 comedy films
Found footage films
Universal Pictures films
2014 directorial debut films
Films directed by Philippe Lacheau
2010s French films